Baoqing County is a county of southeastern Heilongjiang province, People's Republic of China. It is under the jurisdiction of the prefecture-level city of Shuangyashan.

Administrative divisions 

There are six towns, and four townships in the county:

Towns (镇)
Baoqing Town
Qixingpao
Qingyuan
Longtou
Xiaochengzi
Jiaxinzi

Townships (乡)
Zhaoyang Township
Qixinghe Township
Wanjinshan Township
Jianshanzi Township

Climate 
Baoqing has a humid continental climate (Köppen Dwa), with long, bitterly cold, but dry winters, and humid, very warm summers.

Demographics 

Notes and references

See also

External links
  Government site - 

 
Baoqing
Shuangyashan